Robert Vincent "Roy" Cortina (b. March 14, 1964 in New York City) is an American-born Argentine politician, president of the Socialist Party in the City of Buenos Aires. Since December 2015 he has served as the 3rd Vice President of the Buenos Aires City Legislature, after serving as a national deputy from 2007 to 2015.

Roy Cortina is PRO's socialist ally and bets on its political future: "Horacio Rodriguez Larreta will know how to combine an inclusive and modernizing project in Argentina."

Electoral history

References 

1964 births
Living people
American emigrants to Argentina
Citizens of Argentina through descent
Socialist Party (Argentina) politicians
Politicians from New York City
Members of the Buenos Aires City Legislature
Members of the Argentine Chamber of Deputies elected in Buenos Aires
21st-century Argentine politicians